The Sunset Limited is an Amtrak passenger train that for most of its history has operated between New Orleans and Los Angeles, over the nation's second transcontinental route. However, from 1993 to 2005 (when Hurricane Katrina decimated the right of way), the train continued on to Florida, terminating in Miami from 1993 to 1996 (using the Silver Meteors route), and in Orlando from 1996 to 2005. It is the oldest continuously operating named train in the United States, introduced in 1894 by the Southern Pacific Railroad, and acquired by Amtrak upon its formation in 1971.

Along with the Cardinal, this train is one of Amtrak's two long-distance services which operate thrice weekly. Consequently, the Sunset Limited carried the third-fewest passengers of any Amtrak train in fiscal year 2019, 92,827, a 4.4% decrease over FY2018. It had a total revenue of $10,769,179 in 2016, marking a 7.5% decrease over FY2015.

Route 

For most of its existence, the Sunset Limited route was owned by the Southern Pacific Railroad. The name Sunset Limited traces its origins to the Galveston, Harrisburg and San Antonio Railway, a Southern Pacific subsidiary which was known as the Sunset Route as early as 1874.

Most of the current route from New Orleans westward is now owned by the Union Pacific Railroad, which acquired Southern Pacific in 1996. However, the route within Louisiana and some of Texas was partially sold to BNSF Railway in 1995 in return for BNSF not objecting to the UP-SP merger.

On the portion of the route east of New Orleans, service was suspended after Hurricane Katrina. Those tracks, between New Orleans and Florida, include parts of the Atlantic Coast Line Railroad, the Seaboard Air Line Railroad, and the Louisville and Nashville Railroad—all now merged into CSX Transportation. Currently, the segment of the former Atlantic Coast Line Railroad between DeLand and Orlando is owned by Orlando's commuter service SunRail, and the segment of track from Pensacola to Baldwin is now owned by the Florida Gulf & Atlantic Railroad.

The train uses the following route segments, identified here by the names of their original owners:

Ridership

History

Southern Pacific 
Before the start of Amtrak on May 1, 1971, the Sunset Limited was operated by the Southern Pacific Railroad. The Sunset Limited is the oldest named train in the United States, operating since November 1894 along the Sunset Route (though originally named the Sunset Express). The Sunset Route (originating in New Orleans) is the southernmost of the three gateways to the West Coast envisioned through the Pacific Railroad Acts. The other two embarked from Chicago and St. Louis. However, the Sunset Route had two major advantages over the other two routes. It was an all-weather, year-round route that did not face the crippling snows of the Wasatch or Sierra mountain ranges to reach the Pacific Coast. Additionally, the other two routes had to assault the front range of the Rockies.

In addition, opened 20 years before the Panama Canal, the Sunset Route vastly shortened the time to reach the West Coast from the Atlantic Ocean and Caribbean Sea, as New Orleans was already an established seaport for Atlantic shipping lines’ passengers, seeking to reach the US interior. The Sunset Limited allowed passengers to reach the West Coast in a few days, not weeks.

The Sunset Limited was Southern Pacific's premier train. Initially, the Sunset Limited was an all-Pullman train, with sleeping cars and no coaches, running from New Orleans to San Francisco via Los Angeles. From its beginning in 1894, until streamlining in 1950, all the train's cars had 6-wheel trucks and dark olive green paint, with black roofs and trucks. In the summer of 1926, it was scheduled at 71 hr 40 min New Orleans to San Francisco; it then carried a coast-to-coast sleeper from Jacksonville to Los Angeles.

In contrast to its earliest Amtrak years, the Sunset Limited, up to its later years, made stops not only at Phoenix, but also at Mesa and Chandler, Arizona.

Amtrak
Amtrak left the Sunset unchanged, while it dropped the Louisville & Nashville's Gulf Wind, which operated between New Orleans and Jacksonville, Florida. The tracks between these two points remained unused by passenger trains until April 29, 1984, when an Amtrak train called the Gulf Coast Limited, running between New Orleans and Mobile, Alabama, began service, seeking to regenerate some form of regional intercity rail traffic between large cities outside the Northeast. However, this train only lasted until January 6, 1985. Almost five years later, on October 27, 1989, the track segment between Mobile and Flomaton, Alabama, came into passenger train use as part of the route of the Gulf Breeze. This was another attempt to regenerate regional inter-city rail traffic, this time between Birmingham, Alabama, and Mobile. The train was a reestablishment of the Mobile section of Amtrak's New York City–New Orleans Crescent. It branched from the Crescents route at Birmingham, turning south toward Montgomery, Flomaton, and terminating in Mobile. The Gulf Breeze was discontinued in 1995.

Meanwhile, on April 4, 1993, passenger service was reestablished along the entire New Orleans–Jacksonville corridor with the extension of the Sunset Limited to Miami, using the route of Amtrak's Silver Meteor south of Jacksonville; it was serviced at Amtrak's Hialeah yards for the return trip. It was only the second direct rail link between Orlando and Miami, following local trains by the Atlantic Coast Line and Seaboard Coast Line in the mid-1960s. However, schedule unreliability caused the Sunset Limited'''s eastern terminus to be truncated to Sanford on November 10, 1996. Service was re-extended to Orlando on October 26, 1997, and the train deadheaded (operated empty) between Orlando and Sanford for servicing. Sanford was, and still is, the servicing point for Amtrak's Auto Train.

On September 22, 1993, the three locomotives and four of the eight cars of the eastbound Sunset Limited derailed and fell off a damaged bridge into water near Mobile, Alabama, in Amtrak's worst train wreck, the Big Bayou Canot rail accident. 47 people died.
On October 9, 1995, saboteurs derailed the Sunset Limited near Harqua, Arizona by removing 29 spikes from a section of track, and short-circuited the signal system to conceal the sabotage. The attack killed one person and injured dozens of others. The crime still remains unsolved.

On June 2, 1996, the Sunset Limited was rerouted to a more southerly route between Tucson, and Yuma, Arizona, bypassing Phoenix. Union Pacific, which had acquired Southern Pacific earlier in the year, wanted to abandon a decaying portion of its Phoenix–Yuma "West Line" that had previously been used to serve Phoenix. Amtrak Thruway Motorcoach service, run by Stagecoach Express, connects the two cities.

The Sunset received a better schedule on May 7, 2012, moving its westbound movements from New Orleans to a Monday, Wednesday, Saturday circuit. The times allow several 7- to 12-hour rides between major-city pairs; for example, overnight between Tucson or Maricopa (for Phoenix) and Los Angeles in both directions.

Since 1981, the Texas Eagle has operated as a section of the Sunset Limited. A coach and sleeper from the Texas Eagle split from the eastbound Sunset Limited in San Antonio and continue to Chicago, combining with the westbound Sunset Limited for the journey to Los Angeles. The Texas Eagle runs independently between Chicago and San Antonio for the rest of the week. Between October 2020 and May 2021, the Texas Eagle ran tri-weekly due to massive service reductions triggered by the COVID-19 pandemic.

A Sunset Limited Consist includes two GE P42DC Locomotives, a Viewliner II Baggage Car, a Superliner transition Sleeper, a Superliner sleeper, a Superliner dining car, a Superliner sightseer lounge car, a Superliner coach-baggage car, two Superliner coaches and a Superliner Sleeper at the rear.

Hurricane Katrina service suspension
On August 29, 2005, the Sunset Limited route was truncated at San Antonio, Texas, as a result of damage to trackage in the Gulf Coast area caused by Hurricane Katrina. In late October 2005, service was restored between San Antonio and New Orleans, as the line through Louisiana had been repaired.

As time has passed, particularly since the January 2006 completion of the rebuilding of damaged tracks east of New Orleans by their owner CSX Transportation Inc., the obstacles to restoration of the Sunset Limiteds full route have been more managerial and political than physical. Advocates for the train's restoration have pointed to revenue figures for Amtrak's fiscal year 2004, the last full year of coast-to-coast Sunset Limited service. During that period, the Orlando–New Orleans segment accounted for 41% of the Sunset's revenue.

Section 226 of the Rail Safety Improvement Act of 2008, signed into law by President George W. Bush on October 16, 2008, gave Amtrak nine months to provide Congress with a plan for restoring service that "shall include a projected timeline for restoring such service, the costs associated with restoring such service, and any proposals for legislation necessary to support such restoration of service."

, Amtrak's schedules and maps describe the route between Mobile and Orlando as suspended.

New Gulf Coast train service

In January 2016, Amtrak and the Southern Rail Commission announced jointly that a Gulf Coast passenger rail inspection trip was to be made from New Orleans to Jacksonville, with elected officials among those on board during the February 18–19 excursion. Stops were planned for all of the stations formerly part of the Sunset Limited's route between those two cities. In June 2018, the commission missed the deadline for submitting a request for service restoration along the Gulf. It said that it could not apply for the Federal Railroad Administration's (FRA) fiscal-year 2017 Consolidated Rail Infrastructure Safety and Improvements (CRISI) funding because Alabama and Mississippi were unwilling to assist with funds. Alabama's share would have been $5.3 million. The Louisiana governor, on the other hand, was willing to provide the funds. The three states' cooperation was needed to secure the $35.5 million in federal CRISI funds.

In June 2019, the Federal Railroad Administration announced a grant award of $33 million to restore Amtrak service between New Orleans and Mobile, and to upgrade tracks, stations, and other facilities to support improved passenger rail service. The grant was matched by funds from Louisiana, Mississippi, and the city of Mobile. Officials announced plans for up to four daytime rail trips per day within 24 months, serving the cities of New Orleans, Bay St. Louis, Gulfport, Biloxi, and Pascagoula. Having received a commitment of support from the City of Mobile, if the state of Alabama participates, service could be extended to downtown Mobile.

On February 23, 2021, following the conclusion of one year of negotiations with CSX and Norfolk Southern, Amtrak officials announced that Gulf Coast Service between New Orleans and Mobile would start as early as January 2022. Amtrak plans to pay for repairs along the route. As of late 2022, after lengthy negotiations with Norfolk Southern and CSX, Amtrak now expects Gulf Coast service to begin sometime in 2023.  

 Restoration of the Florida Panhandle Service 
In terms of the rest of the route for the restoration of Florida Panhandle service, Amtrak stated that their "focus has been on restoring service from New Orleans to Mobile, Alabama," and they would be "willing to explore such service [on the Florida Panhandle] with the state’s financial support." The mayors and city councils of Pensacola, Tallahassee, and Lake City have shown much interest in resuming the service. The corridor would eventually need to be upgraded for speeds greater than 45 mph, and some of the stations require refurbishment or replacement.

Potential daily service

In 2009, Brian Rosenwald, a now-departed Amtrak executive, outlined ideas for a complete overhaul of the route, including daily service. It was to have the Texas Eagle operate over the Sunset's route west of San Antonio, with a stub train connecting San Antonio (with a cross-platform transfer) and New Orleans. The plans were halted when Union Pacific stated that to get a daily Sunset Limited, Amtrak would need to pay $750 million for infrastructure improvements.

Passenger totals would double with daily service, according to the PRIIA study that looked at Texas Eagle/Sunset Limited service. It forecast an incremental improvement of more than 100,000 passengers from the daily service, which is already running in excess of 100,000 a year. In the meantime, the Union Pacific has double-tracked much of the route with its own money. However, Amtrak still lacks the equipment and funds needed to move to daily service.

In June 2021, Senator Jon Tester of Montana added an amendment to the Surface Transportation Investment Act of 2021 which would require the Department of Transportation (not Amtrak itself) to evaluate daily service on all less frequent long-distance trains, meaning the Sunset Limited and Cardinal. The bill passed the Senate Commerce Committee with bipartisan support, and was later rolled into President Biden's Infrastructure Investment and Jobs Act, which Congress passed on November 5, 2021. The report must be delivered to Congress within two years.

 References 

Further reading

 
 Schafer, Mike; "Amtrak's atlas", Trains; June 1991
 Johnston, Bob; "Getting Ready for the Sunset", Trains; March 1993
 Johnston, Bob; "At last, a transcontinental passenger train", Trains''; July 1993

Notes

External links
 
 

Amtrak routes
Passenger trains of the Southern Pacific Transportation Company
Passenger rail transportation in Florida
Passenger rail transportation in Alabama
Passenger rail transportation in Mississippi
Passenger rail transportation in Louisiana
Passenger rail transportation in Texas
Passenger rail transportation in New Mexico
Passenger rail transportation in Arizona
Passenger rail transportation in California
Transportation in Southern California
Night trains of the United States
Railway services introduced in 1894
Long distance Amtrak routes